Galactoside 2-alpha-L-fucosyltransferase 1 is an enzyme that in humans is encoded by the FUT1 gene.

The enzyme is involved in the synthesis of the H antigen.

References

Further reading